István Sofron (born 24 February 1988) is a Hungarian professional ice hockey player who currently plays for MAC Budapest in the Slovak Extraliga (Slovak).

Playing career
He originally played with Alba Volán Székesfehérvár in the Austrian Hockey League. Sofron signed a contract extension with the Transdanubian team in July 2011 and set to play for Alba Volán until 2013.

After six seasons with Székesfehérvár, Sofron left to join German club, Krefeld Pinguine of the DEL, on a two-year contract on 17 May 2013. During the 2015–16 season, his final year with the Pinguine, Sofron left mid-season to rejoin the EBEL, agreeing with EC KAC for the remainder of the campaign.

On 13 June 2016, Sofron made his expected return to Székesfehérvár of the EBEL, signing an optional two-year deal. After just one season with Alba Volan, Sofron opted to accept a North American contract, in agreeing to a one-year deal with the Wichita Thunder of the ECHL on 19 July 2017.

Awards and achievements
Hungarian Championship:
Winner: 2008, 2009, 2010, 2011, 2012

Club
 Austrian Hockey League Top Scorer: 2012
 Gábor Ocskay Jr. Award (Best Forward of the Hungarian Championship): 2012

International
 IIHF World Championship Division I Top Scorer: 2011

References

External links
 

1988 births
Fehérvár AV19 players
Living people
Sportspeople from Miercurea Ciuc
Hungarian ice hockey players
EC KAC players
Krefeld Pinguine players
EC VSV players
Wichita Thunder players
Romanian ice hockey forwards